Alseika is a Lithuanian surname. Notable people with the surname include:

Danielius Alseika
 (1887-1960), Lithuanian traveler, Esperanto speaker, local lore enthusiast, pedagogue
Veronika Alseikienė (1883 – 1971), the first female Lithuanian physician
Marija Birutė Alseikaitė, birth name of Marija Gimbutas

Lithuanian-language surnames